Denmark has an embassy in Athens and an honorary consulate in Thessaloniki.  Greece has an embassy in Copenhagen and two honorary consulates in Arhus and Tórshavn. Both countries are full members of the Organization for Security and Co-operation in Europe, of the Organisation for Economic Co-operation and Development, of NATO and of the European Union.

History

First contact between Danes and Greeks dates back from the 4th century BC, when Greek merchant Pytheas went to Denmark. In 1863, the second King of Greece, George I, was of Danish descent, and his successors, the House of Glücksburg, reigned over the country until 1973/1974. 

In 1967, Denmark and three other countries brought the Greek Case against the Greek junta regime for human rights violations.

In 1992 opened the Danish Institute at Athens.

List of bilateral treaties and agreements
 Conciliation, arbitration and judicial settlement, Athens April 13, 1933
 On the manner of serving legal documents, Athens June 18, 1936
 On the exploitation of regular air transport routes, Athens November 14, 1947
 Trade agreement, Copenhagen February 25, 1949
 Exchange of notes on patents, Athens June 2, 1952
 Abolition of Visa requirement, Athens April 1, 1953
 On reciprocal tax exemption of income gained in shipping or aviation, Athens March 4, 1961
 Cultural cooperation, Athens September 17, 1976
 On international transport with appended Protocol, Copenhagen February 2, 1979
 On the avoidance of double taxation of income or capital, Copenhagen May 18, 1989

Recent bilateral visits
Queen Margrethe II of Denmark attended the Athens Olympic Games in 2004 and she paid an official visit to Greece in May 2006.

Diplomacy

Kingdom of Denmark
Athens (Embassy)

Republic of Greece
Copenhagen (Embassy)

See also
Foreign relations of Denmark
Foreign relations of Greece
Greeks in Denmark

Notes

External links
 Danish embassy in Athens
Greek Ministry of Foreign Affairs about the relation with Denmark
 Greek embassy in Copenhagen

 
Greece
Denmark